Oenothera glazioviana is a species of flowering plant in the evening primrose family known by the common names large-flowered evening-primrose and redsepal evening primrose. Oenothera lamarckiana was formerly believed to be a different species, but is now regarded as a synonym of Oe. glazioviana.

The plant can be found in scattered locations worldwide, mostly as an introduced species. It originated in Brazil.

It has long been cultivated as an ornamental plant. In some locations it has become an invasive species.

Description
Oenothera glazioviana is generally a biennial herb producing an erect stem approaching  in maximum height. It is roughly hairy in texture, the hairs with reddish blistering or glandular bases. The crinkly leaves are up to 15 centimeters long.

The inflorescence is a showy spike of many large flowers. When in bud the long red sepals are visible. When in bloom each flower has four bright yellow petals up to 5 centimeters long which fade orange to red with age. The fruit is a lance-shaped capsule 2 or 3 centimeters long.

Taxonomy
Oenothera glazioviana was first described by Marc Micheli in 1875. Originally native to Brazil, it has become naturalized in many countries, and has acquired a large number of synonyms.

Oenothera lamarckiana
About a century ago, it was believed that there was a different species, either native to some obscure and unknown place in North America, from which it had quickly spread across the world, or more likely a new species which had very recently evolved in the last few decades, possibly in Europe from a hybrid of two other species, and thence had become a common weed. These theories stemmed from the fact that although the species was now a common species, and while an obviously striking species unlikely to be overlooked by botanists, it had only been recorded in recent times, and never in a truly wild state. At the time this taxon was important for the brand new study of genetics, the debate about the cause of evolution, whether that was natural selection or one of the alternatives such as mutationism, and particularly to the discovery of polyploidy. It was later discovered that it had, in fact, already been discovered and described by a botanist in Brazil only a few decades beforehand, in 1875, as Oenothera glazioviana, and had likely spread across the world from there since then, but this had apparently somehow been overlooked.

Distribution
Oenothera glazioviana is native to Brazil. It is cultivated as an ornamental plant, and has become naturalized in many countries around the world, like Britain and Ireland, where it is the most common species of its genus.

Ecology 
Under the synonym Oenothera lamarckiana, it is described as a very adaptable plant: however it needs full sun, average moisture, and well-drained soils. It is easily grown from seed. It began being grown in European gardens during the 1800s.

References

Further reading

External links

Jepson Manual Treatment
Oenothera glazioviana — U.C. Photo gallery

glazioviana
Night-blooming plants
Garden plants of Europe
Articles containing video clips
Flora of Brazil